The Ivorian Football Federation is the governing body of football in Ivory Coast and is in charge of the Ivory Coast national team and other footballing matters in the country. The top teams are as follows:

Ligue 1

Ligue 2

References

External links
 Federation Ivoirienne de Football

Ivory Coast
Football in Ivory Coast
Sports organizations established in 1960
Football